Jeremiah Lowery (19 October 1924 – 1 October 2007) was an English footballer who made 147 appearances in the Football League playing for Newcastle United, Lincoln City, Barrow and Crewe Alexandra. He played as a goalkeeper. He began his career as a youngster before the Second World War with Leicester City, and played for a works team after the war before joining Newcastle United, and also played in the Midland League for Peterborough United and non-league football for Wisbech Town.

References

1924 births
2007 deaths
Footballers from Newcastle upon Tyne
English footballers
Association football goalkeepers
Leicester City F.C. players
Newcastle United F.C. players
Lincoln City F.C. players
Peterborough United F.C. players
Barrow A.F.C. players
Crewe Alexandra F.C. players
Wisbech Town F.C. players
English Football League players
Midland Football League players